Deshbandhu Group is a Bangladeshi diversified conglomerate based in Dhaka. Golam Mostafa is the Chairperson and Golam Rahman is the Managing Director of Deshbandhu Group. It headquarters in Mostafa Centre, Banani, is located inside a residential neighborhood.

History 
Deshbandhu Sugar Mills Limited was established in 1932.

In 2011, Deshbandhu sought approval from the Government of Bangladesh to establish a sugar mill in Thailand or Brazil but was denied permission from Bangladesh Bank.

Sahera Auto Rice Mills Limited started operations on 15 March 2012.

Deshbandhu Group entered in a partnership with Chemtex to build a US$100 million polyester factory in Sirajganj District on 13 September 2015.

The Group invested US$53 million to establish garments factory under Deshbandhu Textile Mills, in Uttara Export Processing Zone in Nilphamari District. The factory was inaugurated by Tipu Munshi, Minister of Commerce, on 5 August 2019. The Government of Bangladesh provided approval to City Group and Deshbandhu Group to export sugar on 4 October 2017.

Deshbandhu Group announced plans to invest US$200 million to develop a joint venture Jiangsu Sanfangxiang Group Co., Ltd to petrochemical and chemical fibre production at Mirsarai Economic Zone in Chittagong on 30 October 2018.

On 31 March 2021, Deshbandhu Group started operations of GM Apparels and Southeast Sweaters. Deshbandhu announced plans to raise US$250 million through issuing Sukuk bond and pay off the loans of the group.

Businesses 

 Deshbandhu Sugar Mills Limited
 Deshbandhu Food & Beverage Limited
 Deshbandhu Consumer and Agro Products Limited
 Sahera Auto Rice Mills Limited
 Deshbandhu Oil Refinery Limited
 Deshbandhu Polymer Limited
 Deshbandhu Packaging Limited
 Deshbandhu Textile Mills Limited
 Southeast Sweaters Limited
 GM Apparels Limited
 Deshbandhu Cement Mills
 GM Holdings Limited
 Rapa Plaza
 Deshbandhu Parcel and Logistics Limited 
 Deshbandhu Shipping Limited
 Deshbandhu Media Limited (Weekly Dudkumar, The Daily Haq Kotha, The Daily Ajkaler Khabar Limited)
 Deshbandhu Power Plant Limited
 TMS Sahera-Wasek Hospital
 Fertilizer Marketing Corporation (FMC)
 M.R. Trading 
 Moru Trading Limited
 Commodities Trading Company (CTC)

References 

1932 establishments in India
Organisations based in Dhaka
Conglomerate companies of Bangladesh